The Bölkow Bo 103 was an ultralight experimental helicopter flown in West Germany in 1961. It was designed for reconnaissance and command-control purposes and constructed by Bölkow Entwicklungen KG as part of a research order by the German Federal Ministry of Defense. 

While the mechanics of the aircraft were based on the Bo 102 captive training rig, the Bo 103 was capable of fully independent flight. In configuration, it was absolutely minimalist - consisting of nothing more than a tubular frame to which the dynamic components and the pilots seat were attached, although a small fibreglass cabin was eventually attached. The aircraft retained the Bo 102's single-rotor of Glass-reinforced plastic, and proved that this was suitable for true flight. A single prototype was built, but work was stopped in 1962 due to lack of interest on the part of the West German armed forces. The prototype is preserved at the Hubschraubermuseum Bückeburg.

Specifications

See also

References

 
 
 EADS website

External links

 picture at Bückeburg helicopter museum.

Bo 103
1960s German experimental aircraft
Monocopters
1960s German helicopters
Single-engined piston helicopters
Aircraft first flown in 1961